Omphalotropis plicosa is a species of minute salt marsh snail with an operculum, a terrestrial gastropod mollusk, or micromollusk, in the family Assimineidae. This species is endemic to Mauritius.

It was thought to be extinct and it was listed as extinct in the 2006 IUCN Red List of Threatened Species.

Living population have been found in 2002.

References

Omphalotropis
Endemic fauna of Mauritius
Taxa named by Ludwig Karl Georg Pfeiffer
Gastropods described in 1852
Taxonomy articles created by Polbot